Turbonilla edwardensis is a species of sea snail, a marine gastropod mollusk in the family Pyramidellidae, the pyrams and their allies.

Description
The shell grows to a length of 5.2 mm.

Distribution
This species occurs in the following locations:
 Northwest Atlantic : Prince Edward Island

Notes
Additional information regarding this species:
 Distribution: Prince Edward Island (from the northern tip of Miscou Island, N.B. to Cape Breton Island south of Chéticamp, including the Northumberland Strait and Georges Bay to the Canso Strait causeway)
 Habitat: infralittoral of the gulf and estuary

References

External links
 To Encyclopedia of Life
 To USNM Invertebrate Zoology Mollusca Collection
 To ITIS
 To World Register of Marine Species

edwardensis
Gastropods described in 1909